The 2005 Winnipeg Blue Bombers finished in 5th place in the West Division with a 5–13 record and failed to make the playoffs.

Offseason

CFL draft

Regular season

Season standings

Season schedule

References

Winnipeg Blue Bombers
Winnipeg Blue Bombers seasons